Eugene Ludovic Wamalwa is a Kenyan politician who was the former Cabinet Secretary of the Ministry of Defense. Prior to that before 29 September 2021, he was Cabinet Secretary of Devolution. He is also a former minister for Justice. He also served as Minister for Water and Irrigation. He belongs to the Jubilee Party and was elected to represent the Saboti Constituency in the National Assembly of Kenya since the 2007 Kenyan parliamentary election.

Early life
Born on 1 April 1969, in Saboti at the foot of Mount Elgon, Eugene Wamalwa took his A levels at Gendia High School in Homa Bay.  After the successful completion of his secondary education, he joined the University of Nairobi Nairobi where he undertook a bachelor's degree in Law and thereafter obtained a diploma in Kabarak University.

Professional life
Eugene was admitted to the bar in 1995 and thereafter joined the private legal practice. One of his highlights as a practicing lawyer was representing President Yoweri Museveni in 2001 Uganda presidential election petition against opposition leader Kizza Besigye

Political life
The death of his brother and vice president Michael Wamalwa Kijana in 2003 vacated the Saboti MP seat. In the following by-elections, Eugene Wamalwa vied for the seat under little known Republican Party of Kenya (RPK). The by-election was won by Davies Wafula Nakitare of NARC.

He again contested the Saboti parliamentary seat on a FordKenya ticket under the PNU umbrella in 2007 and won. He showed interest as a candidate in the 2013 presidential elections but later decided to support Musalia Mudavadi under the AMANI Coalition.

On 17 April 2015, Eugene Wamalwa was nominated as the Cabinet Secretary for Water and Irrigation Services.

References

1969 births
Living people
Defense ministers of Kenya
Kenyan Luhya people
Members of the 11th Parliament of Kenya
Members of the National Assembly (Kenya)
People from Bungoma County